"Fully Loaded" is a song by American rappers Trippie Redd, Future and Lil Baby. It was released on January 20, 2023 from the Redd's fifth studio album Mansion Musik, and was produced by Loesoe, Peter Jideonwo and Redda.

Composition
Andre Gee of Rolling Stone described Trippie Redd as "belting for blood" in the song.

Reception
Preezy Brown of Vibe called the song a "clear standout" from Mansion Musik. Lil Baby's feature also received a polarizing reaction from fans, some of whom were critical; Twitch streamer Kai Cenat angrily reacted to it on a live stream which went viral, saying that Baby's effort did not live up to the expectations of his career.

Charts

References

2023 songs
Trippie Redd songs
Future (rapper) songs
Lil Baby songs
Songs written by Trippie Redd
Songs written by Future (rapper)
Songs written by Lil Baby